{{Automatic taxobox
| name = Flannelbush
| image = Fremontodendron Ken Taylor.jpg
| image_caption = Fremontodendron 'Ken Taylor'(F. californicum × F. mexicanum')
| taxon = Fremontodendron
| authority = Coville
| synonyms = Fremontia Torr. nom. illeg.
| subdivision_ranks = Species
| subdivision = Fremontodendron californicumFremontodendron decumbensFremontodendron mexicanum}}Fremontodendron, with the common names fremontia and flannelbush or flannel bush, is a genus of three known species of shrubs native to the Southwestern United States and northwest Mexico.CalFlora Database: Fremontia species . accessed 2.28.2015

Taxonomy
They are within the botanical family Malvaceae. Formerly they were treated within the Sterculiaceae, tribe Fremontodendreae, together with the genus Chiranthodendron. The genus Fremontodendron was named in dedication to John C. Frémont, who first collected it during an 1846 expedition to Alta California.

Description
The leaves have a leathery and fuzzy texture reminiscent of flannel (hence the name), and the yellow to orange flowers are large and showy. The leaves and young shoots can cause skin and eye irritation.

Species
There are three species:
 Fremontodendron californicum — Californian flannelbush
 Fremontodendron decumbens (R. Lloyd) — Pine Hill flannelbush USDA Plants Profile for Fremontodendron decumbens (Pine Hill flannelbush) . accessed 2.28.2015
In nature it only grows in metal-rich gabbro soil, a red weathered soil of volcanic origin. It requires fire for seed germination, but with the nature reserve is near human settlements fire ecology is suppressed. It is a federally listed endangered species.
 Fremontodendron mexicanum — Mexican flannelbush
Endemic to the central Peninsular Ranges, known from about ten occurrences in northern Baja California state and adjacent southern San Diego County, California. However, it has most recently been confirmed to exist in only two of those locales currently.

There are a number of populations of uncertain taxonomy status. They include:Fremontodendron californicum ssp. napensis — Napa fremontia
The current Jepson manual does not recognize this subspecies, using Fremontodendron californicum, but the form is different enough that it is horticulturally recognized by this name. It is typically smaller and more open in form than the species, with much smaller leaves and flowers.

CultivationFremontodendrons are cultivated as ornamental plants. They are valued for their bright yellow flowers, produced over a long period on a rapidly growing shrub or small tree. They are tolerant of pruning for size or shaping. They are adapted to dry, poor soils in a summer-dry, warm, sunny climate. They may succumb to root rot in heavy clay soils and/or summer irrigation.

The three species and varied hybrids/cultivars are used in native plant, water-conserving, and wildlife gardens in California. They are also planted in gardens in England.

Hybrids
It is the winner of the Award of Garden Merit from the California Horticultural Society in 1965, and received a First Class Certificate from the Royal Horticultural Society in 1967. A hybrid between Fremontodendron decumbens and Fremontodendron mexicanum.

References

External links

CalFlora Database: Species of genus Fremontodendron
Malvaceae.info:  Fremontodendreae webpages (Fremontodendron and Chiranthodendron)
Pinehillpreserve.org: Pine Hill Flannelbush (Fremontodendron decumbens)   — in the Pine Hill Ecological Reserve''

Bombacoideae
Flora of California
Flora of Baja California
Flora of the Southwestern United States
Natural history of the California chaparral and woodlands
John C. Frémont
Malvaceae genera
Garden plants of North America
Drought-tolerant plants
Shrubs